Cho Seong-jin is a Korean name consisting of the family name Cho and the given name Seong-jin, and may also refer to:

 Cho Sung-jin (born 1985), South Korean footballer
 Seong-Jin Cho (born 1994), South Korean pianist